Hai Xia (born 9 March 1972)  is a Chinese news anchor for China Central Television, the main state announcer of China.

She won the Golden Mic Award in 2007.

Hai Xia is known all over China as an announcer for the 7:00 pm CCTV News program Xinwen Lianbo, which has reach all over China on various networks and internationally, is one of the most watched news programs in the world.

Biography
Hai Xia was born in Zhengzhou, Henan in 1972, and she is of the Hui people descent. she studied at Zhengzhou Muslim School.

After graduating from Communication University of China in 1993 she was assigned to China Central Television to host Morning News, Nightly News, and Live News.

Hai Xia hosted Xinwen Lianbo since 2007.

In 2008, she became a member of the 11th National Committee of the Chinese People's Political Consultative Conference.

Works

Television
 Morning News
 Nightly News
 Live News
 Xinwen Lianbo

Awards
 2007 Golden Mic Award

Personal life
Hai Xia was married to Luo Yongzhang, who is a professor at Tsinghua University, their daughter, Luo Luo, was born in 2002.

References

1972 births
People from Zhengzhou
Beijing Normal University alumni
Communication University of China alumni
Hui people
Living people
CCTV newsreaders and journalists
Members of the 11th Chinese People's Political Consultative Conference
Members of the 12th Chinese People's Political Consultative Conference
Members of the 13th Chinese People's Political Consultative Conference